The Rai Sikh is a Sikh community mainly found in the states of Haryana, Rajasthan, Uttar Pradesh, Uttrakhand, Delhi and  Punjab in India. They practice clan exogamy despite being endogamous.

References 

Social groups of Punjab, India
Punjabi tribes
Social groups of Haryana
Dalit communities
Sikh communities
Denotified tribes of India